The Château d'Oigny is a manor-house in the region of Villers-Cotterêts, which was built in the style of Louis XII between 1498 and 1515.

It is located in Oigny-en-Valois, Aisne and bought by American investor Matthew Le Merle in 2001.

References

External links 
www.chateauoigny.com

Châteaux in Aisne